United States v. Thomas may refer to:
United States v. Thomas (1894), 151 U.S. 577
United States v. Thomas (1904), 195 U.S. 418
United States v. Thomas (1962), 13 U.S.C.M.A. 278, on the impossibility defense
United States v. Thomas (1997), 116 F.3d 606 (2d Cir. 1997), on removing a juror from a jury